Roosevelt Field is a former airport, located  east-southeast of Mineola, Long Island, New York.  Originally called the Hempstead Plains Aerodrome, or sometimes Hempstead Plains field or the Garden City Aerodrome, it was  a training field (Hazelhurst Field) for the Air Service, United States Army during World War I.

In 1919, it was renamed in honor of President Theodore Roosevelt's son, Quentin, who was killed in air combat during World War I.

Roosevelt Field was the takeoff point for many historic flights in the early history of aviation, including Charles Lindbergh's 1927 solo transatlantic flight. It was also used by other pioneering aviators, including Amelia Earhart and Wiley Post.

History
A bluff 15 feet in elevation divided the plain into two large fields. The U.S. Army Signal Corps established the Signal Corps Aviation Station, Mineola, on the west field in July 1916, as a pilot training school for members of the National Guard.

World War I
When the U.S. entered the war in April 1917, the entire field was taken over and renamed Hazelhurst Field after Leighton Wilson Hazelhurst Jr.   Hazelhurst was a native of Georgia and was a graduate of the United States Military Academy.    He reported for aeronautical duty at the Signal Corps Aviation School, Augusta, Georgia, on 2 March 1912.   On 11 June 1912, while making a flight at College Park, Maryland, as a passenger in an airplane undergoing acceptance tests, the plane crashed to the ground and  both the pilot and Lt. Hazelhurst were killed.

An adjacent tract of land south of the Hempstead branch line of the Long Island Rail Road was acquired for expansion, becoming Camp Mills along Clinton Road and Hazelhurst Aviation Field No. 2 to the east, part of the massive Air Service Aviation Concentration Center. Hazelhurst Field No. 2 was renamed Mitchel Field on July 16, 1918, to commemorate John Purroy Mitchel, the former mayor of New York killed in a flying accident on July 6, 1918, while training with the U.S. Air Service in Louisiana. On September 24, 1918, the Army dedicated the eastern portion of Hazelhurst Field No. 1 as Roosevelt Field.

Air Service units that assigned to Hazelhurst Field were:
 Permanently assigned
 46th Aero Squadron (II), July 1918-January 1919
 52d Aero Squadron (II), July–November 1918

 Assigned to Aviation Concentration Center for deployment to AEF

 168th Aero Squadron, December 1917-January 1918
 Transferred to Port of Entry, Hoboken. NJ (AEF)
 170th Aero Squadron, February–March 1918
 Transferred to Port of Entry, Hoboken, NJ (AEF)
 213th Aero Squadron, December 1917-January 1918
 Transferred to Port of Entry, Hoboken, NJ (AEF)
 220th Aero Squadron, March 1918
 Transferred to Port of Entry, Hoboken, NJ (AEF)
 369th Aero Squadron, January–February 1918
 Transferred to Port of Entry, Hoboken, NJ (AEF)
 370th Aero Squadron, January–February 1918
 Transferred to Port of Entry, Hoboken, NJ (AEF)

 371st Aero Squadron, January–February 1918
 Transferred to Port of Entry, Hoboken, NJ (AEF)
 372d Aero Squadron, January–February 1918
 Transferred to Port of Entry, Hoboken, NJ (AEF)
 374th Aero Squadron, February–March 1918
 Transferred to Port of Entry, Halifax, NS (AEF)
 822d Aero Squadron, March–April 1918
 Transferred to Port of Entry, Hoboken, NJ (AEF)
 15th Construction Company, July–August 1918
 Transferred to Port of Entry, Hoboken, NJ (AEF)

 Returning to United States from Europe
 141st Aero Squadron, July 1919 (Demobilization)
 497th Aero Squadron, April 1919 (Demobilization)
 505th Aero Squadron, January 1919 (Demobilization)

 First Atlantic crossing by air in both directions
On the morning of 5 July 1919, the British R34 (airship) landed after having crossed the Atlantic as the first aircraft to cross in the east–west direction. It later returned to Britain, being the first aircraft to complete an Atlantic crossing in both directions.

After the armistice, the Air Service authorized several companies to operate from the fields but maintained control until July 1, 1920, at which time the government sold its buildings and improvements and relinquished control of the property.

Civil use
Once in civilian hands, the owners sold portions along the southern edge of the field and split the remainder of the property into two separate areas. Curtiss Field, a 300-acre airport on the original site of Hazelhurst Field, occupied half of the western portion along Clinton Road. Roosevelt Field occupied the remainder, consisting of seven hangars and a large parking ramp adjacent to Curtiss Field, and an east–west packed clay runway 5000 feet in length on the bluff. The area between Curtiss Field and the Long Island Motor Parkway, which ran north of and parallel to Stewart Avenue, became the Old Westbury Golf Course, while the area to the east of the golf course was used as the Meadow Brook Polo Field. Both areas are now completely developed.

In pursuit of the Orteig Prize, René Fonck attempted to take off the Sikorsky S-35 from Roosevelt Field's long runway on September 21, 1926, but the aircraft was severely overweight and stressed the auxiliary landing gear mounted to help support the load, losing a wheel.  Unable to gain lift speed, the plane cartwheeled off the end of the bluff and burst into flames, killing two of its crew. The following May, operating from a hangar at Curtiss Field, Charles Lindbergh used the Roosevelt Field runway for the takeoff of the Spirit of St. Louis on his flight to Paris.

Both fields were bought in 1929 by Roosevelt Field, Inc. The western field, called "Unit 2", and the runway atop the bluff, called "Unit 1", were connected by a broad earthen taxi ramp and the consolidated property was named Roosevelt Field. Unit 1 was sold in 1936 and became the Roosevelt Raceway, while Unit 2 continued to operate as an aviation center under the name Roosevelt Field. At its peak in the 1930s, it was America's busiest civilian airfield.

Closure
Roosevelt Field was used by the Navy and Army during World War II. After the war, Roosevelt Field reverted to operation as a commercial airport until it was acquired by real estate developers in 1950.  The field closed on May 31, 1951.

The eastern field first became an industrial park but is now largely retail shopping, including the Mall at The Source on the site of the former runway, and townhouses, while the site of the original flying field in 1911–1916 has become a shopping mall.

Fresco
Aline Rhonie Hofheimer (1909–1963), painted a 126-foot fresco representing aviation history in Roosevelt Field, Long Island. It has since been relocated to the Vaughn College of Aeronautics and Technology in Queens, NY.

Mall

Manhattan-based real estate company Webb and Knapp gained a controlling interest in the airfield in 1950 and later built light factories on the former Unit 2. Currently its site is occupied by Roosevelt Field Mall and Garden City Plaza.

In popular culture
 Arthur J. Burks, "Haunted Hangars" (two-part serial), Flyers, January & February, 1930. Referred to as "Mineola field."

See also

 Mitchel Air Force Base
 Republic Field, nearest active airfield
 Columbia Field, a nearby, defunct, historical airfield, also named Curtiss Field.
 List of Training Section Air Service airfields

References

External links

 UNH: 1918 USGS map of Hazelhurst/Roosevelt Field and environs
 Abandoned & Little-Known Airfields: New York, Central Long Island

Airports established in 1916
Airports in Nassau County, New York
Closed installations of the United States Army
Defunct airports in New York (state)
World War I airfields in the United States
World War I sites in the United States